Zenker's turaco  (Tauraco persa zenkeri), is a subspecies of the Guinea turaco. It is a green turaco, in the family Musophagidae, subfamily Tauracinae, a group of near-passerines birds. Zenker's turaco is found in forests of Central Africa in the Congo Basin in Gabon, DR Congo and Congo-Brazzaville and south to northern Angola. It forms part of a superspecies complex that extends from West Africa to East Africa and as far south as the Cape in Southern Africa and include the black-billed turaco, Emin's turaco, Schalow's turaco,  Livingstone's turaco, the Transvaal turaco and the Knysna turaco, as subspecies within the group.

References

Tauraco
Birds described in 1896
Subspecies